Kumushkhon Fayzullaeva (born 20 January 2002) is an Uzbekistani weightlifter. She won the gold medal in the girls' 63kg event at the 2018 Summer Youth Olympics held in Buenos Aires, Argentina.

Career 

She won the bronze medal in the women's 58kg event at the 2017 Youth World Weightlifting Championships held in Bangkok, Thailand. At the 2017 Islamic Solidarity Games held in Baku, Azerbaijan, she won the silver medal in the women's 63kg event.

In 2018, she won the gold medal in the women's 63kg event at the Junior World Weightlifting Championships held in Tashkent, Uzbekistan. In that same year, she competed in the 64kg event at the 2018 World Weightlifting Championships and in 2019, she also competed in the 64kg event, in both cases without winning a medal. In 2018, she finished in 21st place and in 2019, she improved her result with a finish in 10th place.

She won the gold medal in the women's 64kg event at the 2019 Youth World Weightlifting Championships held in Las Vegas, United States. She also won the bronze medal in the women's 64kg Snatch event at the 6th International Qatar Cup held in Doha, Qatar. In 2021, she won the silver medal in the women's 71kg event at the Junior World Weightlifting Championships held in Tashkent, Uzbekistan.

She represented Uzbekistan at the 2020 Summer Olympics in Tokyo, Japan. She finished in 6th place in the women's 76kg event. A few months later, she competed in the women's 71kg event at the 2021 World Weightlifting Championships held in Tashkent, Uzbekistan.

Achievements

References

External links 

 

Living people
2002 births
People from Navoiy Region
Uzbekistani female weightlifters
Weightlifters at the 2018 Summer Youth Olympics
Youth Olympic gold medalists for Uzbekistan
Islamic Solidarity Games medalists in weightlifting
Weightlifters at the 2020 Summer Olympics
Olympic weightlifters of Uzbekistan
21st-century Uzbekistani women